Stalham High School is a mixed secondary school located in Stalham in the English county of Norfolk.

Description
It is one of the smallest high schools in Norfolk, with 431 pupils on the roll in January 2015. The school mainly admits pupils from surrounding primary schools in Catfield, East Ruston, Hickling, Lessingham, Ludham, Stalham, Sutton and Worstead. The school offers GCSEs as well as a range of vocational courses as programmes of study for pupils.

On 1 January 2015, the school was given academy status, sponsored by the North Norfolk Academy Trust, led by Sheringham High School.

Since October 2015, the school has become a 'Community Hub' within the Norwich City Community Sports Foundation (CSF).

The school has previously been designated as a specialist Humanities College as part of the specialist schools programme and it was a member of the Microsoft IT Academy programme.

References

External links
Stalham High School official website

Secondary schools in Norfolk
Academies in Norfolk
Educational institutions established in 1939
Stalham
1939 establishments in England